Aarkkariyam is a 2021 Indian mystery drama film directed and co-written by Sanu John Varghese. Co-written by Arun Janardanan and Rajesh Ravi, the film stars Biju Menon, Parvathy Thiruvothu, and Sharafudheen. The film is produced by Aashiq Abu and Santhosh T. Kuruvilla, Aarkkariyam released on May 17, 2021. The film was released to highly positive reviews.

Plot 
The COVID lockdown of 2020 serves as the backdrop for the narrative. Ittyavira (Itty), a retired math teacher from Kerala, resides alone in Palai, Kottayam. Shirley, his only child, is married to Roy and resides in Mumbai. A businessman by profession, Roy is having some financial troubles. The slowdown by COVID just makes matters worse. Shirley and Roy visit Pala for a vacation. Itty hears about their financial difficulties while they are at Pala and lets them know that he is prepared to sell his estate, which would be more than enough to take care of Roy's financial issues and leave some money for Itty. Itty also wants to dispose off the large property and live in an apartment due to his age and failing health. However, Itty informs Roy that before selling the property, he wants to dig up the skeleton of a man he had killed and buried at the property as construction by the new owner might lead to the discovery of the skeleton.

Roy is shocked at the revelation. The dead man is none other than Shirley's wayward first husband Augustine. The incident happens when Shirley was in hospital after the birth of her daughter and Augustine comes home after months of disappearance and is amused that she was pregnant and had a baby. Itty lets Roy know the circumstances of the crime. Itty also doesn't disclose the crime to his daughter as he believes that everything happens due to God's will.

The crime was never discovered as Augustine used to disappear for long periods and a decomposing body was identified as Augustine's body by his mother and Shirley. Roy is in anguish, he doesn't want to be an abettor in the crime but finally helps Itty dig up the bones and burn it. Old Itty moves into his new apartment and begins to shows signs of dementia.

In the last scene of the movie, Shirley narrates how she was haunted by the pity of the people after Augustine's disappearance and how as a young and dependent mother, she wanted a closure of the events. She admits that she never identified the body as Augustine's mother has identified it. Roy is left with the sinking realization that he would forever carry this secret like a cross to his grave.

Cast 
 Biju Menon as Ittyavira
 Parvathy Thiruvothu as Shirley
 Sharaf U Dheen as Roy
 Saiju Kurup as Vyshak
 Rahul Reghu as Sundaran
 Jacob George James as Augustin
 Thejaswini Praveen as Sophie
 Shobha Mohan as Sr. Alphonsa
 Prasant Murali as Sajan
 Pramod Velliyanad as Bhasi
 Hareesh Pengan

Marketing and release
Aarkkariyam was released on 1 April. Later it was streaming on Amazon Prime Video, Koode OTT, Neestream, Roots Video and Cave OTT platforms from May 19.

Music 
The music for the film is composed by Neha Nair and Yakzan Gary Periera with lyrics penned by Anwar Ali.

Accolades

References

External links 

2021 films
2020s Malayalam-language films